Lealt  is a crofting township, on the western coastline of the Sound of Raasay on the Trotternish peninsula of  Skye, in the Highlands of Scotland and the council area of Highland. The Lealt River which gives its name to Lealt, passes through on the way to the Sound of Raasay.

History 
The name "Lealt" means "Stream with one high bank".

References

See also
 Lealt Valley Diatomite Railway.
 

Populated places in the Isle of Skye